George Kearsley Shaw (10 December 1751 – 22 July 1813) was an English botanist and zoologist.

Life
Shaw was born at Bierton, Buckinghamshire, and was educated at Magdalen Hall, Oxford, receiving his M.A. in 1772. He took up the profession of medical practitioner. In 1786 he became the assistant lecturer in botany at the University of Oxford. He was a co-founder of the Linnean Society in 1788, and became a fellow of the Royal Society in 1789.

In 1791 Shaw became assistant keeper of the natural history department at the British Museum, succeeding Edward Whitaker Gray as keeper in 1806. He found that most of the items donated to the museum by Hans Sloane were in very bad condition. Medical and anatomical material was sent to the museum at the Royal College of Surgeons, but many of the stuffed animals and birds had deteriorated and had to be burnt.  He was succeeded after his death by his assistant Charles Konig.

Works

Shaw published one of the first English descriptions with scientific names of several Australian animals in his "Zoology of New Holland" (1794). He was among the first scientists to examine a platypus and published the first scientific description of it in The Naturalist's Miscellany in 1799.

In the field of herpetology he described numerous new species of reptiles and amphibians.

His other publications included:
Musei Leveriani explicatio, anglica et Latina', containing select specimens from the museum of the late Sir Ashton Lever (1792–96), which had been moved to be displayed at the Blackfriars Rotunda.
General Zoology, or Systematic Natural History (16 vol.) (1809–1826) (volumes IX to XVI by James Francis Stephens) 
The Naturalist's Miscellany: Or, Coloured Figures of Natural Objects; Drawn and Described Immediately From Nature (1789–1813) with Frederick Polydore Nodder (artist and engraver).

The standard botanical author abbreviation G.Shaw is applied to species he described.

References

Mullens and Swann - A Bibliography of British Ornithology (1917)
William T. Stearn - The Natural History Museum at South Kensington

External links

Zoologica Göttingen State and University Library Digitised The Naturalist's Miscellany and Musei Leveriani explicatio
 Museum Leverianum formatted transcript. 

1751 births
1813 deaths
18th-century British botanists
English zoologists
British mammalogists
Botanists with author abbreviations
Fellows of the Royal Society
Fellows of the Linnean Society of London
Alumni of Magdalen Hall, Oxford
Employees of the British Museum
19th-century British botanists